The Hawaiian Cottage (or simply The Cottage) was a Polynesian style restaurant in Cherry Hill, New Jersey, United States. It opened in 1938, on Cherry Hill's western side, on Route 38, nearby the Cherry Hill Mall (which later opened in 1961). The Cottage was established by Michael Egidi and Mary Egidi-Pietrafesa. Started as a roadhouse, the restaurant soon emerged into what was considered a South Jersey landmark.  The restaurant's exterior was known for its vivid yellow, pineapple-shaped dome, burning Polynesian torches at the entrance, and a Hawaiian atmosphere that included a luau show. After Mr. Egidi's death in a car accident in the early 1940s, Mrs. Egidi continued to operate the business. Her second husband, John Muresan, helped with the restaurant's growth. On July 1, 1978, the restaurant was destroyed by a fire.   

Both John and Mary Muresan died in 1997.

References

External links 
Hawaiian Cottage YouTube video

Cherry Hill, New Jersey
Hawaiian cuisine
Restaurants in New Jersey
Restaurants established in 1938
Defunct restaurants in the United States
Restaurants disestablished in 1978
1978 fires in the United States
1938 establishments in New Jersey
1978 disestablishments in New Jersey